Yangambam Kumar College, Wangjing, established in 1972, is a general degree college in Wangjing, Thoubal district, Manipur. It offers undergraduate courses in science and arts. It is affiliated to  Manipur University.

Departments

Science
Physics
Chemistry
Mathematics
Environmental Science
Botany
Zoology

Arts
Manipuri
English
History
Geography
Political Science
Economics
Education
Physical Education

Accreditation
The college is recognized by the University Grants Commission (UGC).

See also
Education in India
Manipur University
Literacy in India
List of institutions of higher education in Manipur

References

External links
http://ykcollege.ac.in/

Colleges affiliated to Manipur University
Educational institutions established in 1972
Universities and colleges in Manipur
1972 establishments in Manipur